Abbey Junction railway station was the railway junction where the branch line to  Silloth on the Solway Firth divided from the Solway Junction Railway in the English county of Cumberland (later Cumbria).

History

A station on the site was opened as Abbeyholme by the Carlisle and Silloth Bay Railway in 1856, and was then renamed Abbey Junction by the North British Railway in 1870. It closed in 1921.

A parallel station on the site was opened as Abbey Junction by the Maryport and Carlisle Railway. It closed briefly from 1917 to 1919 then permanently in 1921.

The closure of the stations was linked to the closure of the Solway viaduct.

References

Sources

External links
 The station on a navigable Edwardian 6" OS map, via National Library of Scotland
 Carlisle & Silloth Bay Railway
 The line with period photographs, via Holme St Cuthbert History Group (archive copy)
 The station via Rail Map Online

Disused railway stations in Cumbria
Former North British Railway stations
Railway stations in Great Britain opened in 1856
Railway stations in Great Britain closed in 1921
Former Caledonian Railway stations
Railway stations in Great Britain opened in 1870
Railway stations in Great Britain closed in 1917
Railway stations in Great Britain opened in 1919
1856 establishments in England
1921 disestablishments in England